Umbu Mehang Kunda Airport , also formerly known as Mau Hau Airport, is an airport serving Waingapu, the largest town on the island of Sumba, in the province of East Nusa Tenggara in Indonesia.

The airport inaugurated a new terminal in 2016 which is able to improve passenger services from the previous old terminal. There are some car parking lots and taxi stand outside the terminal.

Facilities

Airlines and destinations

References

External links 
Umbu Mehang Kunda Airport - Indonesia Airport Global Website

sumba
Airports in East Nusa Tenggara